This is a list of tribute albums dedicated to American singer Gwen Stefani. Amongst projects in honor of Stefani include various cover albums, instrumental albums, and karaoke albums. Following the release of Stefani's first solo studio album in 2004, Love. Angel. Music. Baby., the Vitamin String Quartet released The String Quartet Tribute to Gwen Stefani (2005) to pay tribute. Including covers of songs as performed with string instruments, the album was criticized for being uninteresting. Big Eye Music released two records – both titled A Tribute to Gwen Stefani – in 2006 and 2007. The first album contains 11 covers of Stefani's solo material and her work with No Doubt as performed by the Hollaback Girls tribute band. In addition, an unrelated cover of Coldplay's "Yellow", performed by Tina Root's side-project Tre Lux, serves as a bonus track. The 2007 version features Sabrina Claudio performing a cover of No Doubt's 2000 single "Simple Kind of Life".

Several karaoke albums dedicated to Stefani's discography have been released. Chartbuster Karaoke released All Songs in the Style of No Doubt and Gwen Stefani in 2005, a single CD with 15 songs from No Doubt and Stefani's catalogs. The same label also distributed a two-part Gwen Stefani collection, with the first volume released in 2007 and the second in 2009. Volume one contains five songs from Love. Angel. Music. Baby. and her 2000 duet with Moby titled "South Side", while the second volume has five songs from The Sweet Escape and "South Side". Roma Music Group distributed children's-friendly collections of Stefani and No Doubt's music with Lullaby Versions of Gwen Stefani & No Doubt and the EP Music Box Versions of Gwen Stefani & No Doubt in 2011 and 2014, respectively.

In 2011, Renegade Karaoke released Instrumental Tribute to Madonna, Gwen Stefani & Shakira, featuring karaoke Madonna covers like "Material Girl" and "Like a Prayer" and karaoke versions of Shakira's "Whenever, Wherever" and "Underneath Your Clothes". The album contains three No Doubt covers: "Hella Good", "Hey Baby", and "Underneath It All". The 2016 compilation album Instrumental Covers of Gwen Stefani contains a total of 15 songs: the first six tracks are covers of Stefani's solo material whereas the latter nine songs are instrumental covers of Garbage singles.

Tribute albums 
{| class="wikitable sortable plainrowheaders" width=100%
|-
!scope="col" width=30%| Title
!scope="col" class="unsortable"| Album details
!scope="col" class="unsortable"| List of songs
!scope="col" class="unsortable"| Notes
|-
!scope="row"|Chartbuster Karaoke: All Songs in the Style of No Doubt and Gwen Stefani
|
Released: 
Label: Chartbusker Karaoke
Format: CD
|
|

|-
!scope="row"|
|
Released: 
Label: Vitamin Records
Format: CD · digital download
|
|

|-
!scope="row"|
|
Released: 
Label: Big Eye Music
Format: CD · digital download
|{{hidden|Track listing and performers|

"What You Waiting For?"
"Rich Girl"
"Hollaback Girl"
"Luxurious"
"Cool"
"Don't Speak"
"Just a Girl"
"Hey Baby"
"Simple Kind of Life"
"Rock Steady"
"Hey Baby"
"Yellow"
{{hidden|title=Deluxe edition |text=
"Wind It Up"
"Wind It Up" (Instrumental)
"Orange County Girl"
"Orange County Girl" (Instrumental)
}}
Tracks 1–10 and 13–16 performed by the Hollaback Girls.Track 11 performed by New Skin.Track 12 performed by Tre Lux featuring Tina Root.

}}
|

|-
!scope="row"|Gwen Stefani: A Piano Tribute
|
Released: 
Label: CC Entertainment
Format: Digital download
|
|

|-
!scope="row"|Chartbuster Karaoke: All Songs in the Style of Gwen Stefani
|
Released: 
Label: Chartbusker Karaoke
Format: CD
|
|

|-
!scope="row"|Legends Series: No Doubt & Gwen Stefani
|
Released: 
Label: Legends Karaoke
Format: CD
|
|

|-
!scope="row"|
|
Released: 
Label: Big Eye Music
Format: Digital download
|
|

|-
!scope="row"|Chartbuster Karaoke: All Songs in the Style of Gwen Stefani, Volume 2
|
Released: 
Label: Chartbusker Karaoke
Format: CD
|
|

|-
!scope="row"|Performed by Academy Allstars: A Tribute to Gwen Stefani
|
Released: 
Label: One Media Publishing
Format: CD · digital download
|
|

|-
!scope="row"|Instrumental Tribute to Madonna, Gwen Stefani & Shakira
|
Released: 
Label: Renegade Karaoke
Format: CD · digital download
|
|

|-
!scope="row"|Lullaby Versions of Gwen Stefani & No Doubt
|
Released: 
Label: Roma Music Group
Format: CD · digital download
|
|

|-
!scope="row"|Rich Girl – A Tribute to Gwen Stefani
|
Released: 
Label: Ameritz Music Limited
Format: Digital download
|
|

|-
!scope="row"|
|
Released: 
Label: Drew's Entertainment
Format: Digital download
|
|

|-
!scope="row"|Music Box Versions of Gwen Stefani & No Doubt EP
|
Released: 
Label: Roma Music Group
Format: Digital download
|
|

|-
!scope="row"|Instrumental Covers of Gwen Stefani
|
Released: 
Label: White Knight Instrumental
Format: Digital download
|
|
|}

Notes

References

External links 
 Official website
 Gwen Stefani at AllMusic

Tribute albums
Lists of tribute albums